DNA is an album by the American jazz pianist Matthew Shipp with bassist William Parker, which was recorded in 1999 and released on Thirsty Ear. It was their second duo recording; the first was Zo. The album includes two traditional pieces, "When Johnny Comes Marching Home" and "Amazing Grace".

Reception

In his review for AllMusic, Scott Yanow states: "Shipp's dense chords and atonal playing will remind some listeners of Cecil Taylor although there is a lyricism in his music (and an occasional use of space) that is very much his own."

Track listing
All compositions by Matthew Shipp except as indicated
 "When Johnny Comes Marching Home" (Traditional) – 4:04
 "Cell Sequence" – 7:03
 "Genetic Alphabet" – 12:45 
 "DNA" – 5:26 
 "Orbit" – 4:31
 "Mr. Chromosome" – 11:42
 "Amazing Grace" (Traditional) – 2:02

Personnel
Matthew Shipp - piano
William Parker – bass

References

1999 albums
Matthew Shipp albums
Thirsty Ear Recordings albums